The South Aegean is one of the thirteen administrative regions of Greece. It consists of the Cyclades and Dodecanese island groups in the central and southeastern Aegean Sea.

Administration 
The South Aegean region was established in the 1987 administrative reform. With the 2010 Kallikratis plan, its powers and authority were redefined and extended. Along with the North Aegean region, it is supervised by the Decentralized Administration of the Aegean based at Piraeus. The capital of the region is situated in Ermoupoli on the island of Syros. The administrative region includes 50 inhabited islands, including the popular tourism destinations of Mykonos, Santorini and Rhodes.

Until the Kallikratis reform, the region consisted of the two prefectures of the Cyclades (capital: Ermoupoli) and the Dodecanese (capital: Rhodes). Since 1 January 2011 it is divided into 13 regional units, formed around major islands:

 Andros
 Kalymnos
 Karpathos
 Kea-Kythnos
 Kos
 Milos
 Mykonos
 Naxos
 Paros
 Rhodes
 Syros
 Thira (Santorini)
 Tinos

Major communities
Andros (Άνδρος)
Ermoúpoli (Ερμούπολη)
Ialysós (Ιαλυσός)
Kallithéa (Καλλιθέα)
Kálymnos (Κάλυμνος)
Kárpathos (Κάρπαθος)
Kos (Κως)
Léros (Λέρος)
Milos (Μήλος)
Mýkonos (Μύκονος)
Náxos (Νάξος)
Páros (Πάρος)
Petaloúdes (Πεταλούδες)
Ródos (Ρόδος) (Rhodes in English)
Santoríni (Σαντορίνη) or Thíra (Θήρα)

Demographics
The region was the only one in Greece to grow in population between 2011 and 2021, adding a total of 15,527 people (increase of 5%). It overtook Epirus and is presently 9th largest region by population in Greece.

Economy 
The Gross domestic product (GDP) of the province was 6.4 billion € in 2018, accounting for 3.5% of Greek economic output. GDP per capita adjusted for purchasing power was 22,400 € or 74% of the EU27 average in the same year. The GDP per employee was 79% of the EU average. South Aegean is the region in Greece with the second highest GDP per capita.

References

External links

  

 
NUTS 2 statistical regions of the European Union
States and territories established in 1987
Administrative regions of Greece